The  is a fine Japanese green tea, also commonly known as . It has a tangy, berry-like taste, with a long almondy aftertaste and a deep aroma with tones of citrus, grass, and berries.

It can be processed in one of two ways to destroy the enzymes: pan fried (rarely used in Japan, it is the Chinese process), or steamed (as most Japanese teas). Many believe that steaming preserves the vitamins and antioxidants better than pan-frying. The taste varies between the two as well. The pan-fried version has more of an aroma of cooked vegetables. In both cases, the leaves are then rolled into "comma" shapes (instead of being kneaded into "needle" shapes, like sencha teas).

It is produced in the Kyūshū area. The caffeine level is normal for green tea and it can be drunk throughout the day. It can be reinfused, with a slightly different taste.

The name tama-ryoku-cha means "coiled-green-tea" (tama being "ball, jewel" but becoming the attributive "coiled, rolled" here), and guri-cha means "curly-tea" (guri being the name of a classic Japanese decorative pattern, of curly appearance). Both names refer to the comma-shaped, coiled leaves.

See also
List of Japanese teas

References
 "Tamaryokucha = guricha", blog post of tea merchant Mellow Monk
 "Green Tea Basics : Types of Japanese Tea : Guricha", info page of tea merchant Den's Tea

Japanese tea
Green tea